Sandra Palmer (born March 10, 1943) is an American professional golfer. She became a member of the LPGA Tour in 1964 and won 19 LPGA Tour events, including two major championships, during her career. She was elected to the World Golf Hall of Fame in 2023 and will be inducted in 2024.

Amateur career
Palmer was born in Fort Worth, Texas, but grew up (and first played golf) in Bangor, Maine. She attended North Texas State University where she was a cheerleader and Homecoming Queen. Palmer attended North Texas State University, where she was runner-up in the 1961 National Collegiate Championship. While at North Texas State, Palmer joined Alpha Delta Pi sorority. She was a four-time winner of the West Texas Amateur and won the Texas State Amateur in 1963.

Professional career
Palmer turned professional and became a member of the LPGA Tour in 1964. She won 19 events on the Tour, and also several other professional events, including some as a senior. Her two wins in major championships came at the 1972 Titleholders Championship and the 1975 U.S. Women's Open. She topped the money list for 1975 and was awarded the LPGA Player of the Year title. Her ten top-10 finishes on the money list came in ten straight years from 1968 to 1977. She played her last event on the Tour in 1997.

Professional wins

LPGA Tour wins (19)

LPGA Tour playoff record (4–5)

LPGA majors are shown in bold.
Note: Palmer won the Colgate-Dinah Shore Winner's Circle (now known as the Kraft Nabisco Championship) before it became a major championship.

LPGA of Japan Tour wins (2)
1970 Tokai Classic
1973 TV Shizuoka Central Ladies

Other wins (7)
1972 Angelo's Four-Ball Championship (with Jane Blalock)
1973 Angelo's Four-Ball Championship (with Jane Blalock)
1991 Centel Senior Challenge
1992 Centel Senior Challenge
1993 Sprint Senior Challenge
1994 Sprint Senior Challenge
1995 Sprint Senior Challenge

Major championships

Wins (2)

See also
List of golfers with most LPGA Tour wins

References

External links

American female golfers
LPGA Tour golfers
Winners of LPGA major golf championships
Golfers from Texas
Golfers from Washington (state)
University of North Texas alumni
Sportspeople from Fort Worth, Texas
People from Sammamish, Washington
Sportspeople from Bangor, Maine
1943 births
Living people
21st-century American women